The Peasants is a Polish historical film directed by Jan Rybkowski. It was released in 1973. It is based on the novel The Peasants by Władysław Reymont.

This is a film version of the TV series Chłopi from 1972.

Cast 
 Władysław Hańcza as Maciej Boryna
 Emilia Krakowska as Jagna
 Ignacy Gogolewski as Antek
 Krystyna Królówna as Hanka
 Tadeusz Fijewski as Kuba
 Jadwiga Chojnacka as Dominikowa, Jagna's mother
 August Kowalczyk as mayor Piotr
 Franciszek Pieczka as parish priest

References

External links
 

1973 films
Polish historical films
1970s Polish-language films
1970s historical films